HMS Defender was a  destroyer of the Royal Navy.

Built as yard number 609  at Alexander Stephen and Sons, and originally intended to be named Dogstar, she was launched on 27 July 1950.  After a career which saw her involved in the Korean War and conflicts in Malaya, Cyprus, Suez and Aden, she was listed for disposal in 1969, and was used for target practice in the Forth.  She was sold to James A White & Co Ltd, Inverkeithing, Fife for breaking in 1972.

Career

In 1953 Defender took part in the Fleet Review to celebrate the Coronation of Queen Elizabeth II.  She had commissioned for the Far East during 1953 and 1954 and operated with US Navy in Japanese waters during October 1953, taking part in the Korean War.

In 1954 she located the wreck of the battleship  in position . Taking part in the Malay Emergency, Defender carried out a coastal bombardment on the Johor coast, following which she steamed up the Johor River for  reminding any hostile watchers of the Royal Navy presence. At some time between 1955 and 1958 she took part in operations against the terrorist organisation EOKA in Cyprus.

On 19 July 1956 she brought Faisal II of Iraq across the Channel to Dover for a three-day state visit to the United Kingdom. Later the same year she served as escort to the Royal Yacht at Stockholm and Copenhagen and around the Baltic Sea. The ship was diverted to the Mediterranean and proceeded to Suez, where she took part in the hostilities. In 1958 she conducted her first refit, losing her after torpedo tubes in the process and by July 1959 she was back in the Mediterranean – Able Seaman James Simpson of Defender is buried at Kalkara Naval Cemetery in Malta.

From 1963 to 1965 Defender was refitted for the second and last time, losing the forward torpedo tubes and gaining the Type 903 fire-control radar.  HMS Defender was alongside in Barbados 30 November 1966 for the Independence ceremony.The Duke & Duchess of Kent represented the Queen. The day before Christmas Eve in 1966, the ship sailed from Bermuda she was deployed to St Vincent in the Caribbean as a precaution during a period of anticipated political unrest. The next year she was east of Suez again, providing anti-submarine cover for the task force withdrawal from Aden, and then remaining in the Far East until 1969.

Decommissioning and disposal
In 1969 Defender decommissioned and was listed for disposal.  She spent her last days in the Firth of Forth as a target ship before being sold for breaking.

Commanding officers

Notes

References
 
 
 
 
 

Daring-class destroyers (1949) of the Royal Navy
Ships built on the River Clyde
1950 ships
Cold War destroyers of the United Kingdom